Arnulf II may refer to:

 Arnulf II, Count Palatine of Bavaria (died 954), son of Duke Arnulf I of Bavaria
 Arnulf II, Count of Boulogne (died in 971)
 Arnulf II, Count of Flanders (960 or 961 – 987)
 Arnulf II, Archbishop of Milan (died in 1018)